Central Fund is a Bangladesh government fund under the Ministry of Labour and Employment that is responsible for providing financial support to workers. The fund is chaired by the Minister of Labour and Employment.

History
Central Fund was established in 2015 by Government of Bangladesh according to the labor act passed by the parliament in 2013. The purpose of the fund is to help industrial workers in Bangladesh and is jointly funded by the government and private industry. In August 2017, Prime Minister Sheikh Hasina instructed the Ministry of Commerce to bring all industries and factories under the central fund.

References

2015 establishments in Bangladesh
Organisations based in Dhaka
Government agencies of Bangladesh